Juanita van Zyl is a South African former cricketer who played primarily as a batter. She appeared in one Test match for South Africa in 1972, scoring 6 runs against New Zealand. She played domestic cricket for Eastern Province and Western Province.

References

External links
 
 

Living people
Date of birth missing (living people)
Year of birth missing (living people)
Cricketers from Port Elizabeth
South African women cricketers
South Africa women Test cricketers
Eastern Province women cricketers
Western Province women cricketers